The Tābiʿū al-Tābʿīn (singular ) is the generation after the Tābi‘ūn in Islam.

The first generation of Muslims are known as the Sahabah or the companions of Muhammad. The second generation of Muslims which come after the ṣaḥābah are called Tābi‘ūn (also "the successors"). The third generation of Muslims coming after the Tābi‘ūn, who knew at least one Tābi‘, are called tābi‘ al-tābi‘īn. The three generations make up the salaf of Islam.

Definition according to the Sunnis
The Sunnis define a Tābiʿ al-Tābʿīn as a Muslim who: 
 Saw at least one of the Tābiʿun. 
 Was rightly guided. (That would be, according to Sunnis, one who adheres to the beliefs and actions of the Ahlus Sunnah wal-Jama'ah). 
 And the one who died in that state.  Sunnis consider the Tabi' al-Tabi'un  as the best generation after the Tābiʿun.
According to them Muhammad said, "The best people are those living in my generation, then those coming after them (Tābiʿun), and then those coming after (the second generation)''" Sahih Bukhari

List of Tābiʿ al-Tābʿīn 

 Sufyan al-Thawri (97–161 A.H.) 
 Sufyan ibn `Uyaynah (d. 198 A.H.)
 Malik Ibn Anas
 Abu Yusuf
 Muhammad al-Shaybani
 Al-Awza'i (d. 158 A.H.)
 Abdullah ibn Mubarak (118/726-797 AH/CE)
 Al-Shafi'i
 Ahmad ibn Hanbal
 Zaid bin Ali
 Al-Layth Ibn Sa'd
 Hammad Ibn Zayd
 Makki ibn Ibrahim (125–210 A.H.; 742–825 AD)
 Al-Fudayl ibn 'Iyad
Dawood At-Tai
Sari al-Saqati (155-253 A.H.)
Abdullah Shah Ghazi
Muhammad al-Bukhari

See also
 Salaf
 Ahl al-Bayt

References

External links
 Scholars of Islam

Islamic terminology